is a Japanese footballer who plays for Gamba Osaka in the J1 League. His regular playing position is a right back.

Career
After graduating from Kwansei Gakuin University, Takao signed for Gamba Osaka ahead of the 2019 season.  He started his first campaign with the men in blue and black playing for their Under-23 side in J3 League, debuting in week 1 of the 2019 campaign, a home 2-2 draw with Vanraure Hachinohe on 10 March.

Career statistics
Last update: 11 March 2019

Reserves performance
Last Updated: 11 March 2019

References

External links

1996 births
Living people
Association football people from Aichi Prefecture
Japanese footballers
J1 League players
J3 League players
Gamba Osaka players
Gamba Osaka U-23 players
Association football defenders
Kwansei Gakuin University alumni